The Chorrillos Military School is the institution in charge of the undergraduate education of officers of the Peruvian Army.

Overview 
The school was opened in 1830 during the first government of Agustín Gamarra and was relocated to Chorrillos, Lima, Peru in 1888, hence its name.

, its director was Brigade General Carlos Rabanal Calderon.

It was also the alma mater of Manuel Noriega (1962), Vladimiro Montesinos (1966), and Hugo Chávez Frías (1974).

It contains the Escuela de Comandos (Commando School). In 1997, a replica of the Japanese Diplomatic Residency was secretly built there. Tunnels were dug and the rescue plan was practiced again and again until perfect for the Operation Chavin de Huantar that ended the Japanese embassy hostage crisis.  it still existed and was considered a monument to those who took part in the rescue, and sometimes still used in training.

References

External links 

 Escuela Militar de Chorrillos

Peruvian Army
Military academies
Educational institutions established in 1830
1830s establishments in Peru